Mauricio Kattan (born 25 October 1942) is a Bolivian sports shooter. He competed in the mixed skeet event at the 1984 Summer Olympics.

References

1942 births
Living people
Bolivian male sport shooters
Olympic shooters of Bolivia
Shooters at the 1984 Summer Olympics
Place of birth missing (living people)